Ikenna Ugochukwu Iroegbu (born March 14, 1995) is an American-born Nigerian basketball player for Treviso Basket of the Lega Basket Serie A (LBA). Iroegbu played college basketball for Washington State University, and is a member of the Nigerian national team.

Nigeria national basketball team
He participated at the AfroBasket 2017 for the D'Tigers, and averaged 14.8 points, 5 rebounds, and 5 assists per game during the tournament. He was part of the tournaments top Five players.

Professional career
In October 2017, Iroegbu was a point guard for the Los Angeles Clippers.

He was later waived by the Clippers and was sent to play for its NBA G League affiliate the Agua Caliente Clippers where he averaged 12.24 points, 4 rebounds, and 3.8 assists in the 2017-2018 season.

Iroegbu signed with the German Basketball Bundesliga side Science City Jena on a one-year deal for the 2018-2019 basketball season on July 12, 2018. On February 1, 2019, he joined Lietkabelis Panevėžys of the Lithuanian Basketball League for the rest of the season.

For the 2019–20 season, Iroegbu signed with the Capital City Go-Go of the NBA G League. He missed two games in February 2020 with an ankle injury. On February 12, he tallied 25 points, three rebounds, and five assists in a win over the Erie BayHawks.

On December 20, 2020, he has signed with Rasta Vechta of the Basketball Bundesliga. In June 2021, Iroegbu signed with Élan Chalon in France.

On August 13, 2021, he signed with Hapoel Galil Elyon of the Israeli Basketball Premier League.

On July 17, 2022, he has signed with Treviso Basket of the Lega Basket Serie A (LBA).

References

External links
Washington State Cougars bio

1995 births
Living people
2019 FIBA Basketball World Cup players
Agua Caliente Clippers players
American expatriate basketball people in Germany
American expatriate basketball people in Lithuania
American men's basketball players
American sportspeople of Nigerian descent
Basketball players from Sacramento, California
BC Lietkabelis players
Capital City Go-Go players
Hapoel Galil Elyon players
Nigerian expatriate basketball people in Germany
Nigerian men's basketball players
Oak Hill Academy (Mouth of Wilson, Virginia) alumni
Point guards
SC Rasta Vechta players
Science City Jena players
Sportspeople from Elk Grove, California
Universo Treviso Basket players
Washington State Cougars men's basketball players